Pseudandraca is a monotypic moth genus of the family Endromidae erected by Tamotsu Miyata in 1970. The genus was previously placed in the subfamily Prismostictinae of the family Bombycidae. Its only species, Pseudandraca gracilis, was described by Arthur Gardiner Butler in 1885. It is found in Japan.

Former species
Pseudandraca flavamaculata (J.K. Yang, 1995)

References

Endromidae
Moths described in 1885
Monotypic moth genera